Malkovich is a family name of Slavic origin. Notable people with the surname include:

John Malkovich (born 1953), an American actor, producer, and director
Ivan Malkovych (born 1960), Ukrainian publisher and poet

See also
Maljković
Adam Malkovich, a character in the Metroid video game series

Russian-language surnames
Ukrainian-language surnames
Croatian surnames
Jewish surnames